Sean Lawlor (25 January 1954 – 10 October 2009) was an Irish character actor and playwright. He was best known for his portrayal of Malcolm Wallace in Braveheart. He also appeared in Titanic, In the Name of the Father and On Broadway. He appeared in many Irish television films and the RTÉ series Bracken, as well as parts in many Irish films. He produced plays for the stage including his own one-man play, The Watchman, in which he starred.

Death
Lawlor died after a short illness in Dublin on 10 October 2009, aged 55.

Filmography

 By the Sword Divided (1983) - Lt. O'Farrell
 Minder (1984, TV Series) - Eddie
 Bergerac (1985, TV Series) - Martin O'Brien
 Boon (1986) - Sean Mahoney
 Taffin (1988) - Seamus
 Reefer and the Model (1988) - Spider
 Joyriders (1988) - Thug in Men's Room
 Murder in Eden (1991, BBC Miniseries) - Rory Rua
 Into the West (1992) - Policeman
 In the Name of the Father (1993) - Remand Prison Officer
 Braveheart (1995) - Malcolm Wallace
 Trojan Eddie (1996) - Gerry
 Some Mother's Son (1996) - Platoon Leader 
 Space Truckers (1996) - Mel
 The Disappearance of Finbar (1996) - Michael Flynn
 JAG (1997, TV Series) - Jack Moore
 The Second Civil War (1997, TV Movie) - Brendan
 Titanic (1997) - Leading Stroker Charles Hendrickson (uncredited)
 Chicago Hope (1998, TV Series) - Scotty
 Night Man (1998, TV Series)	
 Nash Bridges (1998, TV Series) - Patrick McQuiston
 Winchell (1998, TV Movie) - Miami Sergeant
 Murder, She Wrote: The Celtic Riddle (2003, TV Movie) - John Herlihy
 Red Roses and Petrol (2003) - Prof. Thompson
 On Broadway (2007)	- Martin O'Toole
 The Blue Rose (2007) - Harry (uncredited)
 30,000 Leagues Under the Sea (2007, V) - Captain Nemo
 Live Fast, Die Young (2008) - Sidney Blackstone
 Mega Shark Versus Giant Octopus (2009, V) - Lamar Sanders
 The Black Waters of Echo's Pond (2009) - Charles
 Now Here (2010) - Durant
 Not Another Not Another Movie (2011) - Wallace (final film role)

References

External links

1954 births
2009 deaths
Irish male dramatists and playwrights
Irish male film actors
Irish male stage actors
Male actors from Dublin (city)
20th-century Irish dramatists and playwrights
20th-century male writers